Rock Will Never Die is a Michael Schenker Group live album released in 1984 and recorded at Hammersmith Odeon in London, over two nights in October 1983. The concert was also released in VHS with the same title. This is the last album recorded with Gary Barden before he rejoined the band in 2008.

The final track "Doctor Doctor", which Schenker originally recorded with UFO, features a guest appearance by Klaus Meine and Rudolf Schenker of Scorpions.

Track listing 
See 2009 remastered version for songwriting credits.
 "Captain Nemo" - 3:42
 "Rock My Nights Away" - 4:05
 "Are You Ready to Rock" - 4:07
 "Attack of the Mad Axeman" - 4:10
 "Into the Arena" - 4:00
 "Rock Will Never Die" - 5:25
 "Desert Song" - 6:00
 "I'm Gonna Make You Mine" - 4:57
 "Doctor Doctor" - 4:50

2009 remastered edition
All songs written by Michael Schenker and Gary Barden unless otherwise noted.

 "Captain Nemo" (Schenker) - 3:52
 "Rock My Nights Away" (Andy Nye, Barden) - 4:13
 "Are You Ready to Rock" - 4:13
 "Cry for the Nations" - 5:11
 "Rock You to the Ground" (Schenker, Graham Bonnet) - 5:37
 "Attack of the Mad Axeman" - 5:11
 "Into the Arena" (Schenker) - 4:22
 "Courvoisier Concerto" (Schenker, Paul Raymond) - 2:12
 "Rock Will Never Die" - 5:26
 "Desert Song" (Schenker, Bonnet) - 5:50
 "I'm Gonna Make You Mine" (Nye, Barden, Schenker, Ted McKenna) - 5:34
 "Red Sky" (Schenker, Barden, Chris Glen, McKenna, José Luis) - 6:00
 "Looking for Love" - 3:43
 "Armed and Ready" - 4:45
 "Doctor Doctor" (Schenker, Phil Mogg) - 7:31

VHS track listing
 "Captain Nemo" - 3:42
 "Rock My Nights Away" - 4:05
 "Are You Ready to Rock" - 4:07
 "Attack of the Mad Axeman" - 4:10
 "Into the Arena" - 4:00
 "Courvoisier Concerto" - 2:13
 "Dream On (Rock Will Never Die)" - 5:25
 "Desert Song" - 6:00
 "I'm Gonna Make You Mine" - 4:57
 "Armed and Ready" - 4:46
 "Doctor Doctor" - 4:50

Personnel
 Michael Schenker – lead guitar
 Gary Barden – lead vocals
 Chris Glen – bass
 Ted McKenna – drums
 Andy Nye – keyboards, backing vocals
 Derek St. Holmes – rhythm guitar, backing vocals, lead vocals on "I'm Gonna Make You Mine", co-lead vocals on "Rock You to the Ground"

Additional personnel
 Klaus Meine – co-lead vocals on "Doctor Doctor"
 Rudolf Schenker – rhythm guitar on "Doctor Doctor"

Charts

References 

Michael Schenker Group albums
1984 live albums
Chrysalis Records live albums
Chrysalis Records video albums
1984 video albums
Albums produced by Jack Douglas (record producer)